Thomas Tallis (23 November 1585; also Tallys or Talles) was an English composer of High Renaissance music. His compositions are primarily vocal, and he occupies a primary place in anthologies of English choral music. Tallis is considered one of England's greatest composers, and is honoured for his original voice in English musicianship.

Life

Youth
As no records about the birth, family origins or childhood of Thomas Tallis exist, almost nothing is known about his early life or origins. Historians have calculated that he was born in the early part of the 16th century, towards the end of the reign of Henry VII of England, and estimates for the year of his birth range from 1500 to 1520. His only known relative was a cousin called John Sayer. As the surnames  Sayer and Tallis both have strong connections with Kent, Thomas Tallis is usually thought to have been born somewhere in the county.

There are suggestions that Tallis sang as a child of the chapel in the Chapel Royal, the same singing establishment which he joined as an adult. He was probably a chorister at the Benedictine Priory of St. Mary the Virgin and St. Martin of the New Work, in Dover, where he was employed at an early age, but it is impossible to know whether he was educated there, or he may have sung at Canterbury Cathedral.

Career
Tallis served at court as a composer and performer for Henry VIII, Edward VI, Mary I, and Elizabeth I. He was first designated as an organist at the chapel after 1570, although he would have been employed as an organist throughout his career. 

He avoided the religious controversies that raged around him throughout his service to successive monarchs, though he remained, in the words of the historian Peter Ackroyd, an "unreformed Roman Catholic". Tallis was capable of switching the style of his compositions to suit each monarch's different demands. He stood out among other important composers of the time, including Christopher Tye and Robert White. The author and composer Ernest Walker wrote that "he had more versatility of style" than Tye and White, and "his general handling of his material was more consistently easy and certain." Tallis taught the composer William Byrd, as later associated with Lincoln Cathedral; as well as Elway Bevin, an organist of Bristol Cathedral and Gentleman of the Chapel Royal.

1530s and 1540s
No record of Tallis exists before 1531, when he is named in the accounts of Dover Priory, a Benedictine priory in Kent. He was employed there as the organist, tasked with directing chants from the organ  A "Thomas Tales" is named as the "joculator organorum" at the priory who received an annual payment of £2. The priory was dissolved in 1535; there is no record of Tallis's departure.

Tallis' whereabouts are not known for the next few months until his employment at St Mary-at-Hill in London's Billingsgate ward.  Records show he was paid four half-yearly payments from 1536 to 1538, with the last one being for services—as either a singer or an organist—for the year up to 25 March 1538.

Towards the end of 1538 Tallis moved to the large Augustinian monastery Waltham Abbey, Essex, through contact with the abbot, whose London home was near to St Mary-at-Hill, becoming a senior member there.  When the abbey was dissolved in March 1540, Tallis left without receiving a pension (being recently employed there), and was instead given a one-off payment of 40 shillings. He took away a volume of musical treatises copied by John Wylde, once a preceptor at Waltham. It contained a treatise by Leonel Power that prohibited consecutive unisons, fifths, and octaves; the last page is inscribed with his name.

By the summer of 1540 Tallis had moved to the recently secularized Canterbury Cathedral, where his name heads the list of singers in the newly expanded choir of 10 boys and 12 men. He remained there for two years.

Employment at the Chapel Royal

Tallis's employment in the Chapel Royal probably began in 1543. His name appears on a 1544 lay subsidy roll and is listed in a later document. It is possible that he was connected with the court when at St Mary-at-Hill, as in 1577 Tallis claimed to have “served yo[u]r Ma[jes]tie and yo[u]r Royall ancestors these fortie yeres”. He may have been responsible for teaching the boys of the choir keyboard and composition.

Tallis married, probably for the first time, in around 1552. His wife Joan was the widow of a gentleman of the Chapel Royal. Like many other members of the royal household choir, Tallis and his wife lived in Greenwich,although it is not known if he ever owned his house there. He probably rented a house, by tradition in Stockwell Street. There seem to have been no children of the marriage. 

Mary I granted Tallis a lease on a manor in Kent which provided a comfortable annual income. He was present at her funeral on 13 December 1558 and at the coronation of Elizabeth I the following month.

Tallis was an eminent figure in Elizabeth's household chapel, but as he aged he became gradually less prominent.  In 1575, Elizabeth granted Tallis and Byrd a 21-year monopoly for polyphonic music and a patent to print and publish "set songe or songes in parts", one of the first arrangements of its kind in England. Tallis composed in English, Latin, French, Italian, and other languages. He had exclusive rights to print any music in any language, and he and Byrd had sole use of the paper used in printing music. Amongst the collection of works they produced using their monopoly was the 1575 Cantiones quae ab argumento sacrae vocantur, but it did not sell well and they were forced to appeal to Elizabeth for support. People were wary of the new publications, the sale of which was not helped by both men being Roman Catholics. As Catholics, Byrd and Tallis were forbidden to sell imported music, and were refused any rights to music fonts, or printing patents not under their command. They lacked their own printing press. A second petition in 1577 resulted in the grant of a joint lease of crown lands to the two composers. After the 1575 publication, Tallis is thought to have ceased active composition, as no works from these final years survive.

Final years
Late in his life, Tallis lived in Greenwich, possibly close to the royal Palace of Placentia; tradition holds that he lived on Stockwell Street. He was recorded as a member of Elizabeth I's household in June 1585, and wrote his will in August that year. He died in his house in Greenwich on 20 or 23 November; the different dates are from a register and the Chapel Royal. 

He was buried in the chancel of St Alfege Church, Greenwich. A brass memorial plate placed there after the death of his wife (but before the death of Elizabeth (ONDB)) is now lost. His remains may have been discarded by labourers during the 1710s, when the church was rebuilt.

His epitaph on a brass plaque, lost in the subsequent rebuilding of the church, was recorded by the English clergyman John Strype in his 1720 edition of John Stow's Survey of London

Entered here doth ly a worthy wyght,
Who for long tyme in musick bore the bell:
His name to shew, was THOMAS TALLYS hyght,
In honest virtuous lyff he dyd excell.

He serv’d long tyme in chappel with grete prayse
Fower sovereygnes reygnes (a thing not often seen);
I meane Kyng Henry and Prynce Edward’s dayes,
Quene Mary, and Elizabeth oure Quene.

He mary’d was, though children he had none,
And lyv’d in love full thre and thirty yeres
Wyth loyal spowse, whose name yclypt was JONE,
Who here entomb’d him company now beares.

As he dyd lyve, so also did he dy,
In myld and quyet sort (O happy man!)
To God ful oft for mercy did he cry,
Wherefore he lyves, let deth do what he can.

William Byrd wrote the musical elegy Ye Sacred Muses on Tallis's death. His widow Joan, whose will is dated 12 June 1587, survived him by nearly four years.

Works

Early works
The earliest surviving works by Tallis are Ave Dei patris filia, Magnificat for four voices, and two devotional antiphons to the Virgin Mary, Salve intemerata virgo and Ave rosa sine spinis, which were sung in the evening after the last service of the day; they were cultivated in England at least until the early 1540s. Henry VIII's break from the Roman Catholic Church in 1534 and the rise of Thomas Cranmer noticeably influenced the style of music being written. Cranmer recommended a syllabic style of music where each syllable is sung to one pitch, as his instructions make clear for the setting of the 1544 English Litany. As a result, the writing of Tallis and his contemporaries became less florid. Tallis' Mass for Four Voices is marked with a syllabic and chordal style emphasising chords, and a diminished use of melisma. He provides a rhythmic variety and differentiation of moods depending on the meaning of his texts. Tallis' early works also suggest the influence of John Taverner and Robert Fayrfax. Taverner in particular is quoted in Salve intemerata virgo, and his later work, Dum transisset sabbatum.

The reformed Anglican liturgy was inaugurated during the short reign of Edward VI (1547–53), and Tallis was one of the first church musicians to write anthems set to English words, although Latin continued to be used alongside the vernacular. Queen Mary set about undoing some of the religious reforms of the preceding decades, following her accession in 1553. She restored the Sarum Rite, and compositional style reverted to the elaborate writing prevalent early in the century. Two of Tallis's major works were Gaude gloriosa Dei Mater and the Christmas Mass Puer natus est nobis, and both are believed to be from this period. Puer natus est nobis based on the introit for the third Mass for Christmas Day may have been sung at Christmas 1554 when Mary believed that she was pregnant with a male heir. These pieces were intended to exalt the image of the Queen, as well as to praise the Virgin Mary.

Some of Tallis's works were compiled by Thomas Mulliner in a manuscript copybook called The Mulliner Book before Queen Elizabeth's reign, and may have been used by the queen herself when she was younger. Elizabeth succeeded her half-sister in 1558, and the Act of Uniformity abolished the Roman Liturgy and firmly established the Book of Common Prayer. Composers resumed writing English anthems, although the practice continued of setting Latin texts among composers employed by Elizabeth's Chapel Royal.

The religious authorities at the beginning of Elizabeth's reign, being Protestant, tended to discourage polyphony in church unless the words were clearly audible or, as the 1559 Injunctions stated, "playnelye understanded, as if it were read without singing". Tallis wrote nine psalm chant tunes for four voices for Archbishop Matthew Parker's Psalter published in 1567. One of the nine tunes was the "Third Mode Melody" which inspired the composition of Fantasia on a Theme by Thomas Tallis by Ralph Vaughan Williams in 1910. His setting of Psalm 67 became known as "Tallis's Canon", and the setting by Thomas Ravenscroft is an adaptation for the hymn "All praise to thee, my God, this night"  (1709) by Thomas Ken, and it has become his best-known composition. The Injunctions, however, also allowed a more elaborate piece of music to be sung in church at certain times of the day, and many of Tallis's more complex Elizabethan anthems may have been sung in this context, or alternatively by the many families that sang sacred polyphony at home. Tallis's better-known works from the Elizabethan years include his settings of the Lamentations (of Jeremiah the Prophet) for the Holy Week services and the unique motet Spem in alium written for eight five-voice choirs, for which he is most remembered. He also produced compositions for other monarchs, and several of his anthems written in Edward's reign are judged to be on the same level as his Elizabethan works, such as "If Ye Love Me". Records are incomplete on his works from previous periods; 11 of his 18 Latin-texted pieces from Elizabeth's reign were published, "which ensured their survival in a way not available to the earlier material".

Later works
Toward the end of his life, Tallis resisted the musical development seen in his younger contemporaries such as Byrd, who embraced compositional complexity and adopted texts of disparate biblical extracts. Tallis was content to draw his texts from the Liturgy and wrote for the worship services in the Chapel Royal. He composed during the conflict between Catholicism and Protestantism, and his music often displays characteristics of the turmoil.

Legacy

Tallis is remembered as primarily a composer of sacred vocal music, in part because of his lack of extant instrumental or secular vocal music. 

No contemporaneous portrait of Tallis survives; the one painted by Gerard Vandergucht dates from 150 years after the composer's death, and there is no reason to suppose that it is a fair likeness. In a rare existing copy of his blackletter signature, he spelled his name "Tallys".

A fictionalised version of Thomas Tallis was portrayed by Joe Van Moyland in the 2007 BBC television series The Tudors.

References

Notes

Citations

Sources

Further reading

External links

 Recordings of church music by Tallis in Latin and English from 
 
  (registration required to view the digitised images)
 
 
 Image of Tallis's signature in a book from one of his early places of employment, Waltham Abbey.
 Works by Tallis listed at the EECM Primary Source Database

 
1505 births
1585 deaths
16th-century English composers
16th-century English musicians
Classical composers of church music
English classical composers
English male classical composers
English Roman Catholics
Gentlemen of the Chapel Royal
Renaissance composers